James Hurley may refer to:

 James Hurley (Twin Peaks), a fictional character from the television show Twin Peaks
 James Francis Hurley (born 1962), English murderer
 James R. Hurley (born 1932), Southern New Jersey politician and gambling regulator
 Frank Hurley (James Francis Hurley, 1885–1962), Australian film maker, photographer and adventurer
 Jim Hurley (1902–1965), Irish sportsman and revolutionary
 James E. Hurley (born 1955), American business executive
 James H. Hurley, protein researcher
 James J. Hurley (1915–2002), American businessman and politician
 James L. Hurley, president of Tarleton State University